Sarah Abo is a Syrian-Australian television journalist and reporter. She currently co-hosts Nine Network's breakfast program Today alongside Karl Stefanovic. She also reports stories for Nine's program 60 Minutes.

Early life and career
Abo was born in Damascus, Syria in 1986.  In 1990, she relocated to Melbourne in Australia at the age of four with her parents and two younger sisters.

After graduating from Monash University in 2008, Abo commenced her television career at Network 10's Adelaide newsroom where she initially worked as an archiving and production assistant before becoming a Ten News reporter. After two years, Abo moved back to Melbourne where she continued to work as a reporter for Network 10 for another three years.

Personal life
On December 15 in 2012, Abo married Cyrus Moran.

SBS Television
In 2013, Abo began working for SBS Television as a presenter and reporter on programs such as SBS World News, Dateline, Insight and Small Business Secrets. In 2014, Abo completed a fellowship at CNN in Atlanta.

Nine Network
In 2019, Abo joined the Nine Network as a 60 Minutes reporter.  Since joining the network, Abo has regularly filled in as co-host of Nine's breakfast show |Today including in March 2022 when regular co-host Allison Langdon contracted COVID-19.

Abo was chosen to moderate the second leaders' debate between Scott Morrison and Anthony Albanese prior to the 2022 Australian federal election which aired on 8 May 2022. After the debate, Abo was the subject of a controversial tweet posted by Mark Latham, the New South Wales state leader of Pauline Hanson's One Nation, who seemingly used Abo's surname as a racial slur. Criticising Abo's performance as moderator, Latham said "never trust an Abo with something as important as that". The word "Abo" is a highly offensive reference to Aboriginal Australians. The Nine Network said that they intended to report Latham's comments to the authorities while praising Abo's handling of the debate.

In November 2022, Abo was announced as the new co-host of Nine's breakfast program Today in 2023, replacing Allison Langdon who was appointed as the host of A Current Affair following the retirement of Tracy Grimshaw.

References 

Australian women television presenters
60 Minutes (Australian TV program) correspondents
Nine News presenters
Australian people of Syrian descent

1986 births
Living people
People from Damascus